Francisco Javier Gómez Noya (born 25 March 1983) is a Spanish triathlete. He is the winner of five ITU Triathlon World Championships, he holds three ITU Triathlon World Cup titles, and won the Silver medal for Spain at the 2012 Summer Olympics in men's triathlon. He has also won world titles for Ironman 70.3  and XTERRA Triathlon.

Born to Spanish immigrants (both from Galicia) in Basel, Switzerland, he returned to Spain and now lives in Pontevedra, Galicia.

Athletic career
Gómez took up triathlon at the age of 15 after previously playing football and competing in swimming. However his career suffered a setback in 2000 when a routine medical test by the Consejo Superior de Deportes (CSD) revealed an "abnormal heart valve", leading to a six-year battle between Gómez and the Spanish sporting authorities regarding his right to compete internationally. He initially won this right in November 2003, but he was not selected for the 2004 Summer Olympics and in 2005 the CSD banned him from international and domestic competition until February 2006.

In the nine years from 2002 to 2010, Gómez took part in 57 ITU competitions and achieved 54 top ten positions, among which are 23 first-place finishes. In 2003 and in 2008, Gómez was ITU Triathlon World Champion (both under-23 and Elite categories respectively in 2003). In 2007 and 2009 he was the Elite European Champion. He finished second in the World Championships in 2007 and was the runner up in 2011 ITU Sprint Distance Triathlon World Championships.

At the 2008 Summer Olympics in men's triathlon Gómez was among the pre-race favourites to win. With 300 meters to go in that race, Jan Frodeno was the leader of a group made up of Gómez, Athens 2004 Silver medalist Bevan Docherty of New Zealand, and Sydney 2000 Gold medalist Simon Whitfield of Canada. Whitfield opened up the gap with a sprint with only Frodeno responding. Frodeno sprinted away with 50 meters from the finish to claim the gold medal. Simon Whitfield took the silver medal five seconds behind, and New Zealand's Bevan Docherty won the bronze medal 12 seconds back. Gómez placed 4th, 20.64 seconds behind Frodeno.

In 2010, Gómez was the number one in the World Championship Series ranking, in 2009 he was second, his only rivals being the Brownlee brothers Alistair and Jonathan, with whom he represents ECS Triathlon in the French Club Championship Series Lyonnaise des Eaux. At the 2010 ITU Triathlon World Championship final in Budapest, Gómez came second to British triathlete Alistair Brownlee, but despite the loss in the final, he won the Championship overall.

At the London Summer Olympics in 2012, Gómez took the Silver medal in men's triathlon, 11 seconds behind Gold medalist Alistair Brownlee. Following the Olympic games Gómez won the Hy-Vee Triathlon against a highly competitive field. A month later in his first ever cross triathlon race, he won the 2012 XTERRA World Championship.

In 2013, Gómez continued his success from last year winning the Escape from Alcatraz Triathlon and repeating as the Hy-Vee Triathlon winner. He would then go on to win the 2013 ITU World Triathlon Series, his third such title. With this world championship he joined Peter Robertson as the other triathlete with three titles to his name, and is just shy of Simon Lessing who has four world titles. Later that year Gómez competed in his first middle distance race by taking first at the Challenge Half Barcelona race. In February 2014 he raced and won his second middle distance race, Ironman 70.3 Panama.

In 2014, Gómez won his fourth ITU World Championships, winning four out of the eight possible races as well as placing third at the Grand Final, tying him for all time championships with Simon Lessing. Gómez also won the 2014 Ironman 70.3 World Championship. The next year, Gómez took his third consecutive ITU World Championship, and his fifth title overall, by finishing second at the Triathlon World Series Grand Final in Chicago.

In 2019, Gómez won his first full Ironman distance race at Ironman Malaysia with a course record of 8:18:59. He received a qualification slot to the 2020 Ironman World Championship.

ITU results 

The following list is based upon the official ITU rankings. Unless indicated otherwise, the following events are triathlons (Olympic Distance) and refer to the Elite category.

DNF = Did not finish
DNS = Did not start

Gallery

References

External links

 Javier Gómez Noya's official website
 London 2012 profile 

1983 births
Living people
Spanish male triathletes
Spanish expatriate sportspeople in Switzerland
Triathletes at the 2008 Summer Olympics
Triathletes at the 2012 Summer Olympics
Olympic triathletes of Spain
Olympic silver medalists for Spain
Olympic medalists in triathlon
Sportspeople from Galicia (Spain)
Sportspeople from Basel-Stadt
Medalists at the 2012 Summer Olympics
Triathletes at the 2020 Summer Olympics
20th-century Spanish people
21st-century Spanish people